The women's 4 × 100 metres relay event at the 1983 Summer Universiade was held at the Commonwealth Stadium in Edmonton on 11 July 1983.

Results

References

Athletics at the 1983 Summer Universiade
1983